Hyun Choi "Hank" Conger (born January 29, 1988) is a Korean American professional baseball catcher and coach. He is the first base and catching coach for the Minnesota Twins of Major League Baseball (MLB). Conger was selected in the first round, with the 25th overall selection, of the 2006 MLB draft. He played in MLB for the Los Angeles Angels of Anaheim, Houston Astros, and the Tampa Bay Rays from 2010 to 2016. Conger coached for the Lotte Giants of the KBO League from 2020 to 2021 before joining the Twins as a coach in 2022.

Early life
Conger was born in Federal Way, Washington, but was raised in Huntington Beach, California. Conger's mother, Eun, immigrated from South Korea in 1986 and his father, Yun, was adopted from Korea by a United States Navy petty officer and raised in the United States.

Conger originally played basketball due to his size, but began playing baseball at the age of eight and turned his focus there instead. Conger graduated from Huntington Beach High School in 2006, where he was a second team All-American and Gatorade Player of the Year. Conger had planned to attend the University of Southern California if he had not been drafted in the first round.

Professional career

Los Angeles Angels of Anaheim

The Los Angeles Angels of Anaheim selected Conger in the first round, with the 25th overall selection, of the 2006 Major League Baseball draft. He was selected to represent the United States in the 2010 All-Star Futures Game. He hit a three-run home run, earning him MVP honors.

He was promoted to the major leagues as part of September call-ups on September 7, 2010. He made his major league debut on September 11, 2010, as a pinch hitter for Hideki Matsui.  His first hit in the major leagues came off of Cleveland Indians pitcher Jeanmar Gómez on September 15, 2010. His first home run came off of Jeff Niemann on April 5, 2011.

On July 19, 2011, Conger was optioned to the Salt Lake Bees of the Class AAA Pacific Coast League (PCL) to make room on the Angels' active roster for Tyler Chatwood. At the time, Conger was hitting .194 and opponents had been successful at stealing bases 48 out of 56 attempts against him. On August 18, 2011, the Angels recalled Conger.

Houston Astros
On November 5, 2014, the Angels traded Conger to the Houston Astros in exchange for Nick Tropeano and Carlos Perez. Despite hitting 11 homers in a part time role for the Astros, Conger did not control the running game.

Tampa Bay Rays
On December 2, 2015, the Tampa Bay Rays acquired Conger for cash considerations. Conger opened the 2016 season in a platoon with Curt Casali. Conger hit .194 before being optioned to the Durham Bulls on July 11, 2016.

Arizona Diamondbacks
Conger signed a minor league contract with the Arizona Diamondbacks in February 2017. He played in 58 games for the Reno Aces of the PCL, and batted .238. The Diamondbacks released Conger in July 2017.

Pericos de Puebla
On May 4, 2018, Conger signed with the Pericos de Puebla of the Mexican Baseball League. He was released on July 11, 2018.

Post-playing career

Lotte Giants
On December 24, 2019, Conger joined the coaching staff of the Lotte Giants of the Korea Baseball Organization as the new catching coach.

Minnesota Twins
On December 10, 2021, the Minnesota Twins hired Conger as the first base and catching coach.

See also

 Houston Astros award winners and league leaders

References

External links

1988 births
Living people
American baseball players of Korean descent
American expatriate baseball players in Mexico
American people of North Korean descent
Arizona League Angels players
Arkansas Travelers players
Baseball players from Washington (state)
Cedar Rapids Kernels players
Durham Bulls players
Houston Astros players
Los Angeles Angels players
Lotte Giants coaches
Major League Baseball catchers
Mesa Solar Sox players
Mexican League baseball catchers
Navegantes del Magallanes players
American expatriate baseball players in Venezuela
People from Federal Way, Washington
Pericos de Puebla players
Rancho Cucamonga Quakes players
Reno Aces players
Salt Lake Bees players
Scottsdale Scorpions players
Tampa Bay Rays players
American expatriate baseball people in South Korea